Serhiy Umen (born in Pryluky, March 39, 1962) is a retired Soviet football player and Ukrainian coach. He spend most of his career to Desna Chernihiv the main club in Chernihiv. In 1989 he moved for FC Alay and in 1990 until 1992, he moved to Zirka Chernihiv.

Player career
In 1979, Serhiy Umen, started his career in Desna Chernihiv, the main club in Chernihiv. In 1982 with the club got second in the Championship of the Ukrainian SSR, Zone 6. From 1985 to 1986, he moved to Zirka Chernihiv, then in 1986 he moved to Desna Chernihiv again for one season.

Coach career
In 1997, he was pointed ascoach of the female football Lehenda Chernihiv. From 2007 until 2012 he was appointed as coach of Rossiyanka in the city of Khimki in Moscow Oblast, Russia. With the club he won the Russian Leagues in the season 2010, and in 2011–12. He won also the Russian Cups in 2008, 2009 and in 2010.

Honours
As Player
FC Desna Chernihiv
Championship of the Ukrainian SSR: Runner-up 1982

As Coach
Lehenda Chernihiv
 Ukrainian Women's League: 2000, 2001, 2002
 Women's Cup: 2001, 2002

References

External links 
Profile on website 

1962 births
Living people
Soviet footballers
FC Desna Chernihiv players
FC Alay players
WFC Lehenda-ShVSM Chernihiv managers
Female association football managers
Association football goalkeepers